Koston is a surname. Notable people with the surname include:

Dina Koston (1929?–2009), American pianist, music educator, and composer
Eric Koston (born 1975), American professional skateboarder and company owner

See also
Boston (surname)
Roston (surname)